Robert Sidney, 1st Earl of Leicester  (19 November 1563 – 13 July 1626), second son of Sir Henry Sidney, was a statesman of Elizabethan and Jacobean England.  He was also a patron of the arts and a poet. His mother, Mary Sidney née Dudley, was a lady-in-waiting to Queen Elizabeth I and a sister of Robert Dudley, 1st Earl of Leicester, an advisor and favourite of the Queen.

Career
He was educated at Shrewsbury and Christ Church, Oxford, afterwards travelling on the Continent for some years between 1578 and 1583. In 1585 he was elected member of parliament for Glamorganshire; and in the same year he went with his elder brother, Sir Philip Sidney to the Netherlands, where he served in the war against Spain under Robert Dudley. He was present at the Battle of Zutphen where Sir Philip Sidney was mortally wounded, and remained with his brother.

After visiting Scotland on a diplomatic mission in 1588, and France on a similar errand in 1593, he returned to the Netherlands in 1606, where he rendered distinguished service in the war for the next two years. He had been appointed governor of the cautionary town of Flushing in 1588, and he spent much time there. In 1595 he sent his business manager Rowland Whyte to court to lobby for resources for Flushing, and to send him information about events at court including the latest political gossip. Whyte's letters provide a major resource for historians of the period. Whyte himself regularly complains about the indecipherable handwriting of his employer's replies.

In 1603, on the accession of James I, he returned to England. James raised him at once to the peerage as Baron Sidney of Penshurst, and he was appointed chamberlain to the queen consort, Anne of Denmark. In 1605 he was created Viscount Lisle. In August 1605 he decided to visit Vlissingen, but a storm forced his ship to land in Spanish territory at Gravelines. A suspicion arose at the English court that he had intended to go there, perhaps to betray the English-held fortress. Sidney managed to clear himself.

He wrote to William Trumbull in September 1614 with news of the queen's illness, she was "much troubled with paines in her legs and feet". In August 1615 he went with Anne of Denmark to Bath, and was joined by his daughter Catherine and her husband Lewis Mansel who travelled from Margam. Catherine came for medical advice in Bath.

In May 1618 he wrote to Sir Thomas Lake, the king's secretary with news of the queen declaration about efforts to reduce household expenses. She had told him that "while she lives she will obey the king in all things ... She therefore desires his majesty to take what order it shall please him, which shall please her also, for being wholly ignorant in household business, she will not any meddle with them".

In July 1618 he became Earl of Leicester. The title had become extinct in 1588 on the death of his uncle Robert Dudley, part of whose property he had inherited. Sidney wrote to his wife that their promotion was due to Anne of Denmark.

He was ill in September 1618 and was attended at Hampton Court by Henry Atkins and Théodore de Mayerne at the request of Anne of Denmark.

Marriage and progeny

Sidney married twice:

Firstly to Barbara Gamage, a noted heiress and beauty, the daughter of John Gamage, of Coity Castle, a Glamorgan gentleman. By his first wife, he had eleven children.
Sir William Sidney (d. 1613), his eldest son who predeceased his father and died unmarried.
Robert Sidney, 2nd Earl of Leicester, second son and heir.
Henry Sidney
Philip Sidney
Mary Sidney, (Lady Mary Wroth), who married Sir Robert Wroth of Loughton Hall, was like her father a poet; Ben Jonson dedicated The Alchemist to her in 1612.
Catherine Sidney, who married Sir Lewis Mansel. 
Philippa Sidney, married Sir John Hobart, 2nd Baronet, third son of Sir Henry Hobart, 1st Baronet, Lord Chief Justice of the Common Pleas and ancestor of the Earls of Buckinghamshire.
Barbara Sidney, her father called her "Little Bab" in a letter of September 1615.
Dorothy Sidney
Elizabeth
Bridget Sidney

Secondly to Sarah Blount, daughter of William Blount, and widow of Sir Thomas Smythe, by whom he had no children.

Music and poetry
Leicester was a man of taste and a patron of literature, whose cultured mode of life at his country seat, Penshurst Place, was celebrated in verse by Ben Jonson. Robert Sidney was a patron of musicians, as is proved by his being the dedicatee of Robert Jones's First Booke of Songes and Ayres (1600) and A Musicall Banquet (1610) compiled by Robert Dowland, son of the composer John Dowland. Sidney had agreed to be godfather to John Dowland's son, and A Musicall Banquet opens with a Galliard by John Dowland entitled Syr Robert Sidney his Galliard.

Though the brother of one of the most famous poets in the English language, it was not suspected that Robert Sidney had himself been a poet until the 1960s, when his working notebook emerged (in a 19th-century binding) through the dispersal of the Library of Warwick Castle. Subsequent research showed it had been acquired in 1848 after passing through a number of sales beginning with the dispersal of the library at Penshurst in the early 19th century. Sold again at Sotheby's and acquired by the British Library in 1975 (catalogued as Add MS 58435), the autograph is, as its first editor P. J. Croft pointed out, "the largest body of verse to have survived from the Elizabethan period in a text entirely set down by the poet himself".

Armorials

The arms of Robert Sidney, 1st Earl of Leicester showed sixteen quarters as follows:
1. A pheon (Sydney) 2. Barry of ten a lion rampant crowned (Brandon) 3. A lion rampant double queued (Dudley) 4. Two lions passant (Somerie) 5. Barry of six in chief three torteaux a label of three points for difference (Grey, Viscount Lisle) 6. A maunch (Hastings) 7. A wolf's head erased (Lupus, Earl of Chester) 8. Barry of ten as many martlets in orle (de Valence, Earl of Pembroke) 9. A lion rampant (Marshall, Earl of Pembroke) 10. Seven mascles conjoined three and one (Ferrers of Groby) 11. A lion rampant within a bordure engrailed (Talbot) 12. A fess between six crosses crosslet (Beauchamp) 13. Checky, a chevron ermine (Newburgh, Earl of Warwick) 14. A lion statant gardant crowned (Baron de Lisle) 15. A chevron (Tyes) 16. A fess dancetty (West); over-all an inescutcheon of pretence of his wife's paternal arms: quarterly: 1. Five fusils in bend on a chief three escallops (Gamage) 2. Vair (Martel?) 3. Checky, a fess ermine (Turberville of Coity Castle) 4. Three chevrons (Llewellyn)

References

The Poems of Robert Sidney, ed. P. J. Croft (Oxford, Clarendon Press, 1984)

External links
 A Manuscript of poems by Robert Sidney
 Selections from the Poetry of Sir Robert Sidney
 Poems by Robert Sidney at English Poetry

 

1st Earl of Leicester
Knights of the Garter
1563 births
1626 deaths
Robert
Robert
17th-century English nobility
English diplomats
16th-century English diplomats
Alumni of Christ Church, Oxford
English people of the Anglo-Spanish War (1585–1604)
English MPs 1586–1587
16th-century English poets
English male poets
16th-century English nobility
People educated at Shrewsbury School
Household of Anne of Denmark